The Hong Kong Sevens is a rugby sevens tournament held annually in Hong Kong on a weekend in late March or early April. Considered the premier tournament on the World Rugby Sevens Series competition, the Hong Kong Sevens is currently the seventh tournament on the World Series calendar (following the Canada Sevens. The tournament spans three days, beginning on a Friday and concluding on Sunday. The tournament is organised each year by the Hong Kong Rugby Union (HKRU). Due to the COVID-19 pandemic, the tournament was cancelled in 2020 and 2021 respectively. The latest Hong Kong Rugby Sevens was held on Friday 4, Saturday 5, Sunday 6 November 2022.

History

The Hong Kong Sevens was originally the idea of the Marketing and Promotions Manager of Rothman's Export for a Pan Asia 15s Rugby Tournament.

Rodney Bentham-Wood wanted Rothmans to sponsor a pan Asia rugby Tournament. Leah May was considering Carlsberg as the main sponsor. However, after a discussion between him and the chairman of the HKRFU, South African entrepreneur, A.D.C. "Tokkie" Smith, 
it was decided that a Sevens Tournament would be cheaper and simpler to set up.
The idea was then implemented by Duncan McTavish (HKRFC then captain), Trevor J. Bedford OBE (Chairman of Hong Kong Land, Jardine Matheson, Mandarin Oriental Hotel Group and Director of HSBC) and Ian Gow, the Rothmans' Tobacco company executive for Hong Kong. After an initial proposal was refused by the Rugby Football Union in England, the HKRFU changed its focus and sent out invitations to Asian and Pacific sides.

On 28 March 1976, clubs from Indonesia, South Korea, Australia, New Zealand, Tonga, Japan, Sri Lanka, Malaysia and Fiji participated in the first Hong Kong Sevens Tournament at the Hong Kong Football Club in Happy Valley sponsored by Rothmans International and Cathay Pacific. This was an important step as this was one of the first rugby tournaments that attracted commercial sponsorship. Of the countries represented in the inaugural sevens tournament, only Australia and New Zealand did not send national sides, instead being represented by the Wallaroos and the Cantabrians respectively. These two clubs met in the final where the Cantabrians won 24–8.

The series then grew into a competition with national representative sevens sides competing, and with this growth, the tournament moved to the Hong Kong Stadium in 1982.

The Hong Kong Sevens were ahead of their time, and an influential force in the modernisation of rugby union, for example, the Hong Kong Sevens were one of the first rugby union tournaments to attract major sponsorship, when Cathay Pacific sponsored the 1976 tournament. By 1986, the Hong Kong Sevens were held up as a positive example to others:

This Seven-a-Side international tournament is without a doubt the most spectacular, exotic, best organised Rugby competition of its kind in the world, and it has consistently produced the highest standard of Sevens Rugby seen anywhere.

I was not surprised on my first visit to see quality play from the Australian, New Zealand, Fijian, and British players, but I was staggered at the amazingly high quality play produced by countries I never even knew played Rugby. South Korea and Western Samoa were every bit as good as Japan and Tonga. ,  and  found their lack of sheer size and bulk an insuperable handicap, but against each other they displayed a range of running and handling skills which demanded unqualified praise.

The week of the Hong Kong tournament allows 24 Rugby-playing nations to intermingle for several days, and the huge cross-fertilisation of ideas can only be beneficial in the long term for the emerging nations. After the first day of the play when the top eight seeded teams meet the smaller fish in a pool system, the second day is divided into three different competitions... The strength of this great tournament is that on the opening day the most famous players in the world share a pitch with unknown opponents from countries where Rugby is a minority sport... While tournaments like the Hong Kong Sevens continue to be played, Rugby administrators can be confident that the game will continue to thrive in over 100 countries worldwide.

Bill McLaren, in his autobiography Talking of Rugby writes at length about his Hong Kong Sevens experiences:
"I remember a big South Sea islander saying that, in his view, the Hong Kong sevens were really the Olympic games of Rugby Union. There is, too, scintillating running and handling which is what the game is supposed to be all about."

However, despite this apparent diversity, some of the same old problems which had dogged international rugby were still manifest in the Hong Kong Sevens in the 1980s – for example, in a photograph of the  v  game at the tournament in 1984, the teams do not appear to include anyone who is ethnically Arabian or Chinese, instead both teams are quite clearly of northern European ethnic origin.

In 1994, the venue was deemed too small for the tournament and was rebuilt into a 40,000-seat stadium now named the Hong Kong Stadium. New Zealand were the dominant team in the mid 1990s, winning three straight from 1994 to 1996, led by legends Eric Rush and Jonah Lomu.

Today, 24 national representative sides compete in the tournament. These include the 16 'core' members of the IRB Sevens World Series, plus eight further invited teams.

In 1997 and 2005, the Hong Kong Sevens was not held; taking its place was the Rugby World Cup Sevens, which Hong Kong hosted in both years. Fiji won both World Cup Sevens tournaments.

In 1998, the first tournament after the transfer of sovereignty to China, tickets were not sold internationally and the event was stricken with a bankrupt sponsor Peregrine. The Union's Organising Committee worked hard, and successfully implemented its marketing strategy to get the local population involved through "Friday Night is Party Night" and secured CSFB as sponsors "on a spur-of-the-moment", the event was a comparatively huge success. In 2011, after HSBC negotiated title sponsorship to the entire World Sevens Series tournaments, it was no longer possible for Credit Suisse to sponsor the Hong Kong leg after 14 years.

Format 
The Hong Kong Sevens is the sport's most prestigious annual rugby sevens event organised as part of the World Rugby Sevens Series. Historically, it had been contested by 24 teams; all other World Series tournaments had 16 teams participating until the 2012–13 edition. The teams are divided into six pools of four teams, who play a round-robin within the pool. The winning team of the tournament acquires 30 points towards its rankings in the World Series instead of the normal 22, and the runner-up earns 25 points instead of the normal 19. Through the 2008–09 World Series, the Hong Kong Sevens awarded 24 points to the runner-up, and 16-team events offered only 20 points for the winner and 16 for the runner-up.

The 2010 edition saw several significant changes to the tournament format. Foremost among these changes was the introduction of the fourth-level Shield trophy, which had not previously been awarded in Hong Kong. More important within the context of the World Series as a whole, the Cup and Plate are now contested in the same manner as in other competitions, with the losing quarter-finalists in the Cup parachuting into the Plate semi-finals.

World Series qualifier 
Further major changes were made to the event for 2013. These changes resulted from the decision of World Rugby, then known as the International Rugby Board (IRB), to institute a formal promotion and relegation process for core teams (i.e., teams assured of playing in all series events) starting with the 2012–13 series.

For starters, the number of teams involved in the event increased from 24 to 28. However, only 16 of these teams compete for series points. The 15 core teams were joined in the main draw by the winner of the most recent edition of the HSBC Asian Sevens Series. The remaining 12 teams, specifically two qualifiers from each of the IRB's six regional zones, participated in the World Series Pre-Qualifier. Like the main draw, the Pre-Qualifier grouped the entrants into four-team pools. The top two teams from each pool, plus the top two third-place teams, advanced to a quarterfinal round, with the winners of all four matches, along with the Asian Sevens Series winner, advancing to the World Series Core Team Qualifier at the London Sevens.

The IRB further changed the promotion/relegation process in advance of the 2013–14 series. The Pre-Qualifier was folded into the Core Team Qualifier, which now involves 12 teams competing for a single promotion place as part of that season's Hong Kong Sevens.

The total prize money stands at US$150,000. The Cup Champion wins US$100,000, and the runner-up takes home US$25,000; each semi-finalist loser receives US$12,500.

Pool 
Points are awarded in each pool on a different schedule from most tournaments in 15-a-side rugby union—3 for a win, 2 for a draw, 1 for a loss. The first tiebreaker is the head-to-head result between the tied teams, followed by difference in points scored during the tournament.

Trophies round 
Like all other World Series tournaments, four trophies are awarded at the end of a knockout tournament. Before the reorganisation of the tournament in 2013, the six pool winners, plus the two top-rated second-place teams, played for the Cup and Plate. The Cup is awarded to the overall tournament champion. As for the other World Series tournaments, four quarterfinal losers dropped into the bracket for the Plate. The Bowl was contested by the four remaining second-place teams, plus the four top-rated third-place teams, while the Shield was contested by the eight remaining teams. The Shield was contested in Hong Kong for the first time in 2010.

Since the 2013 event, only the 16 teams in the main draw compete for trophies. The format is identical to that of other series events, with the top two teams in each pool advancing to the Cup and Plate tournaments, and the remaining teams contesting the Bowl and Shield. The losers of the Cup quarterfinals drop to the Plate tournament, and the losers of the Bowl quarterfinals drop to the Shield tournament.

Atmosphere
The Hong Kong Rugby Sevens is traditionally one of the biggest events, if not the biggest, on the Hong Kong sporting calendar. As such, there is a tremendous party atmosphere, with the involvement of the entire rugby-playing community. A two-day women's tournament, Hong Kong Women's Rugby Sevens, precedes the men's contests. Under the auspices of the Hong Kong Mini Rugby Football Union, children with local clubs aged between 6 and 12 years play tournaments before the main matches each day. They also take part in the March Past immediately before the semi-final round of the main tournament.

For spectators, particular emphasis is placed on the South Stand, where hordes of fans dress up and dance for most of the duration of Saturday. Activities that typically ensue as the weekend progresses include the throwing of empty beer jugs (banned circa 2006) around the South Stand, Mexican waves, and streakers running across the pitch (prosecutable). Outside the stadium, the 'Sevens Village' at the Indian Recreation Club nearby is an alternative venue to gather and watch matches on giant screens, eat and drink to excess while matches are in progress; and after the match, partying continues with champagne and live music and DJs in the champagne tent. An annual public awareness campaign called "Save Our Sevens" sponsored by KELY Support Group, Hong Kong Rugby Union and supported by Start JG Hong Kong Limited encourages responsible drinking among spectators and interventions among underage drinkers while at the three-day event.

Since 2007 the South Stand has been made officially accessible to over-18s only, due to its hyper and somewhat provocative atmosphere. Streakers were formerly a regular feature, and still occasionally make a showing on the pitch, to the acclamation of the crowd. Nonetheless, most pitch invaders are caught and arrested. Following an incident in 2010 when one spectator climbed onto the crossbars at the south end of the stadium before dodging back into the stands and disappearing, organisers stepped up security and announced a zero-tolerance policy of invaders.

Results by year

All-time results

Qualifier results
Since 2014, the Hong Kong Sevens has also featured a qualifying competition where the winner is promoted to "core team" status for the World Rugby Sevens Series the following season.

Players
At each Hong Kong Sevens since 1980, the player who "most exemplifies the spirit and skills needed in rugby sevens" has received 'The Leslie Williams Award for Best and Fairest Player'.  It is named for the late Leslie Williams, who lived in Hong Kong from 1955 to 1971 and played for Hong Kong Football Club and the national team.  The trophy has been awarded every year since 1980 with the exception of the Rugby World Cup Sevens in 1997 and 2005 when there was a different individual award.  Fijian legend Waisale Serevi is the only player to have won the Leslie Williams Trophy three times and he was also named Player of the Tournament at both RWC events.

Young talent
The Hong Kong Sevens has proven a fertile ground for nurturing young players who go on to star in the 15-man game.

For New Zealand, Jonah Lomu, Christian Cullen, Zinzan Brooke, John Schuster, Rodney So'oialo, Joe Rokocoko, Mils Muliaina and Rico Gear were first introduced to the international game of Sevens. For Australia, former captain George Gregan first demonstrated his ability at the Hong Kong Sevens in the same team as Joe Roff and Ben Tune. For Wales, Jamie Roberts and James Hook are among those who went on to the 15-man national team after playing in the Hong Kong Sevens. South Africa, also, have seen Jean de Villiers, Bryan Habana, Ricky Januarie, Brent Russell and Kabamba Floors showcase their variety of skills at the event.

See also

 Hong Kong Women's Sevens
 Singer Sri Lankan Airlines Rugby 7's
 Rugby Sevens
 World Rugby Sevens Series
 World Rugby Women's Sevens Series
 Rugby World Cup Sevens

References

Printed sources
 Starmer-Smith, Nigel (ed) Rugby – A Way of Life, An Illustrated History of Rugby (Lennard Books, 1986 )

Footnotes

External links
Official website, with coverage
Pictures From the Hong Kong Rugby Sevens, About.com, Rory Boland
"7 reasons to love the Hong Kong Sevens" CNNGO

 
World Rugby Sevens Series tournaments
International rugby union competitions hosted by Hong Kong
Recurring sporting events established in 1976
1976 establishments in Hong Kong